Ojinaga (Manuel Ojinaga) is a town and seat of the municipality of Ojinaga, in the northern Mexican state of Chihuahua. As of 2015, the town had a total population of 28,040.  It is a rural border town on the U.S.-Mexico border, with the city of Presidio, Texas, directly opposite, on the U.S. side of the border. Ojinaga is situated where the Río Conchos drains into the Río Grande (known as the Rio Bravo in Mexico), an area called La Junta de los Rios. Presidio and Ojinaga are connected by the Presidio-Ojinaga International Bridge and the Presidio–Ojinaga International Rail Bridge.

History
Ojinaga was founded around AD 1200 by the Pueblo Native Americans, who were later assimilated by Uto-Aztecan speakers. Ojinaga was first visited by Spanish explorers (led by Álvar Núñez Cabeza de Vaca) in 1535.  (See La Junta Indians)

During the Mexican Revolution, Ojinaga was the scene of the Battle of Ojinaga, between Pancho Villa's revolutionaries and government troops. The U.S. writer Ambrose Bierce may have died there, although that is uncertain.

Culture
Ojinaga still retains its rural culture and environment, with relatively little pollution and few urban problems. Some of the most famous norteño-sax artists are from Ojinaga, such as Polo Urías, Adolfo Urías, Los Diamantes de Ojinaga, Los Rieleros del Norte, Conjunto Primavera, Los Jilgueros del Arroyo, and Los Norteños de Ojinaga.

Location
Because of its location on the Río Grande border between Chihuahua and the U.S. state of Texas, Ojinaga is often a station for narcotic smuggling and illegal immigration. The creation of the "La Entrada al Pacífico" or "The Entrance to the Pacific", has made Ojinaga and Presidio, Texas, into a proposed inland trade corridor between the two countries. The route extends into Odessa-Midland, Texas. Several changes have also had to be made to the port of entry in Presidio, Texas, to accommodate the growing amount of traffic crossing the border. Truck lanes for heavy vehicles have also been added.

Economy

Ojinaga serves as a support center and market community for the surrounding area. Though it is on the border Ojinaga has drawn little benefit in the form of maquiladoras. Selkirk has a plant which makes chimney, venting and air distribution products. Solitaire Homes has established a factory for producing prefabricated homes. There are about  used for agriculture the largest area is in cattle pasture, the main crops are soy, cotton, corn, wheat, onions, peanuts, canteloupes and vegetables. There are mineral deposits which consist of lead, silver, coal, zinc, manganese, marble and uranium which are found here.

Popular References

Ojinaga is featured in the novel Streets of Laredo by Larry McMurtry as the hometown of Maria, the midwife of Ojinaga and mother of Joey Garza.

See also
Ojinaga Cut

References

Rio Conchos
Populated places in Chihuahua (state)
12th-century establishments in Mexico
Chihuahua (state) populated places on the Rio Grande